Altitude FC is a Canadian semi-professional soccer club based in North Vancouver, British Columbia that plays in League1 British Columbia.

History
The club was officially unveiled on November 15, 2021, as an inaugural license holder for the first season of the new semi-professional League1 British Columbia in 2022. The founders began working on forming the club in 2020, when BC Soccer issued an RFP for interested clubs. Located in the city of North Vancouver, the club plans to represent the entire North Shore region, as well as the Sea-to-Sky Corridor. The group was formed by Faly Academy and a group of local investors and is set to play out of Kinsmen Stadium. The club intends to work alongside local youth clubs, such as North Van FC, West Van FC, and the North Shore Girls SC, rather than to try to compete with them for players, who can move to Altitude as part of the player pathway. 

Their inaugural matches, for both the male and female teams, occurred on May 22 against Rivers FC, with the men drawing 1-1 and the women being defeated 2-0. Their first home matches occurred on May 29 against the Vancouver Whitecaps Academy,  in front of a sold-out crowd featuring over 700 fans in attendance with an additional 200 people standing outside of the fenced venue. They formed a rivalry with TSS FC Rovers called the Ironworkers Memorial Derby.

Seasons

Men

Women

References

Soccer clubs in British Columbia
Altitude
Association football clubs established in 2021
2021 establishments in British Columbia